Sweet Sensation may refer to:

 Sweet Sensation (band), British soul group 
 Sweet Sensation (trio), American female dance trio
 Sweet Sensation (The Embassy album), 2013
 Sweet Sensation (Stephanie Mills album), 1980
 Sweet Sensation (Flo Rida song)